The Diplomat is a 1949 novel by the Australian writer James Aldridge. The book tells the story of three British diplomats, while they set out for a journey, to get acquainted with the situation in Iranian Azerbaijan and Iranian Kurdistan at the brink of the Cold War.

1949 Australian novels
Novels set in Iran
The Bodley Head books
Novels by James Aldridge